3-Hydroxypropionic acid is a carboxylic acid, specifically a beta hydroxy acid. It is an acidic viscous liquid with a pKa of 4.5.  It is very soluble in water, soluble in ethanol and diethyl ether. Upon distillation, it dehydrates to form acrylic acid, and is occasionally called hydracrylic acid

3-Hydroxypropionic acid is used in the industrial production of various chemicals such as acrylates.

Synthesis
3-Hydroxypropionic acid can be obtained by base-induced hydration of acrylic acid followed by reacidification. Another synthesis involves cyanation of ethylene chlorohydrin followed by hydrolysis of the resulting nitrile. Hydrolysis of propiolactone is yet another route.

Potential applications
The polyester  poly(3-hydroxypropionic acid) is a biodegradable polymer. The method combines the high-molecular weight and control aspects of ring-opening polymerization with the commercial availability of the beta hydroxy acid, 3-hydroxypropionic acid which is abbreviated as 3-HP. Since 3-HPA can be derived from biological sources, the resulting material, poly(3-hydroxypropionic acid) or P(3-HPA), is biorenewable.

Genetically encoded 3-hydroxypropionic acid inducible system
3-Hydroxypropionic acid can be produced by engineered microbes.

A genetically encoded 3-hydroxypropionic acid inducible system has been characterized in bacteria demonstrating that such system in combination with fluorescent reporter protein can be utilized as a biosensor to measure intracellular and extracellular 3-HP concentrations by fluorescence output.

See also
Lactic acid (2-hydroxypropanoic acid)
 listed as hydracrylic acid in the Merck index, 12th Edition

References

External links

Beta hydroxy acids
Propionic acids